Ephysteris brachyptera is a moth in the family Gelechiidae. It was described by Ole Karsholt and Klaus Siegfried Oskar Sattler in 1998. It is found on Madeira, in the north Atlantic Ocean, southwest of Portugal.

References

Ephysteris
Moths described in 1998